Ervinka is a 1967 Israeli film written and directed by Ephraim Kishon. The film, starring Chaim Topol (best known for his role as Tevye from Fiddler on the Roof) is a comical tale of a con man who falls in love with a police officer.

Plot
Ervinka is a young man living in Tel Aviv of the 1960s. He does not believe in work, morality, law and order, and settling down. He ekes out a living as a petty con man by charging parking fees to a lot that doesn't belong to him, stealing electricity from his neighbors, eating for free in family events he is not invited to, and extorting money from movie directors by revving up his moped engine near their film sets. He also finds ways to con the authorities, taking advantage of the stupidity, laziness, and inefficiency of bureaucrats (a favorite subject of Kishon's work). Ervinka even ingratiates himself with the local underworld by getting them out of trouble with the law over a robbery. His only dream is to win the lottery so he would not have to get by on his wits anymore.

Ervinka's carefree life becomes complicated when he falls in love with Ruti, a police officer. While she loves him, she is equally appalled by his way of life and is concerned that he is on a slippery slope to a life of crime.

Tired of never winning the lottery, Ervinka devises a devilish con to rob the lottery offices in Tel Aviv. Under the guise of making a movie, he has his underworld friends try to crack the lottery safe open while all around him are spectators and even police officers, all under the impression that they are watching a film director at work. When the underworld has problems getting the safe to open, the police volunteers its own expert to help them so that filming could proceed as planned. Thanking them for their help, Ervinka and his friends leave with the money seconds before the authorities realize what is actually going on.

With next week's jackpot safely tucked in a bag behind his moped seat, Ervinka believes he has realized his dream. However, his police officer object of affection tracks him down, while he's making his escape. She confesses her feelings for him to be just as strong as his are for her, but makes it clear she will not associate with a criminal. Choosing her over the money, Ervinka returns the money to the General Manager of the lottery in an official ceremony just like the one he had always imagined himself receiving this money in.

Cast
Chaim Topol as Ervinka
Gila Almagor as Ruti
Shraga Friedman as Mr. Veinrib
Shaike Ophir as the Police Sergeant
Avner Hizkiyahu as Ervinka's partner Yossi
Edna Fliedel as Liz, the neighbor
Yossi Banai as Maurice, the neighbor & Liz's husband
Shaike Levi as  Friedrich (underworld)
Yisrael Poliakov as  Leon (underworld)
Gavriel Banai as  Musa (underworld)
Mosko Alkalai as Zigler

Production notes
 Ervinka is a hypocorism of the name Ervin. In the movie, it is actually pronounced "Arbinka."

References

External links

1967 films
Films directed by Ephraim Kishon
Israeli comedy films